Charlotte Greig (born 10 August 1954, Malta, died 19 June 2014) was a British novelist, playwright, music journalist, singer and songwriter.

Early life
Charlotte Greig's father was in the navy and the family travelled the world. In 1962, she attended Charsfield village school, later described in Ronald Blythe's book Akenfield, where she learned to sing folk songs. At the age of 10 she was sent to a convent boarding school, St Stephen's College, Broadstairs, Kent, where she learned to play piano. She studied philosophy at Sussex University during the 1970s, a setting recounted in A Girl's Guide to Modern European Philosophy.

Career

Journalism
After university, Greig worked as a music journalist in print and radio. In 1990 she presented a six-part series on BBC Radio 1 called Will You Still Love Me Tomorrow on girl groups in popular music. It was based on her own book of the same title, published in 1989. In 1991 she wrote another Radio 1 documentary, British Black Music, and went on to present popular music features for BBC Radio 4's Woman's Hour and Kaleidoscope. By 1998 Greig was working for Mojo magazine, reviewing folk and country music.

Music
In the same year, she issued the first of her own albums, Night Visiting Songs. It consisted of four traditional songs, with the rest written by herself. This has set the tone for her subsequent albums: acoustic understated gothic folk music. Unusually, she plays harmonium and mountain dulcimer, with occasional electronic additions. Four further albums are collaborations with guitarist Julian Hayman. Her main influences are Lal Waterson and Nico. She appeared on the Topic anthology A Woman's Voice (many other anthologies exist with the same title). In 2007 she curated and contributed to Migrating Bird, a tribute album to the late Lal Waterson released on Honest Jon's record label.
In addition, Greig's 2008 song Crows was released on a compilation album entitled The Crow Club released on People Tree Records, an offshoot label of Acid Jazz Records.
In 2014, Greig released "Studies in Hysteria" by Doctor Freud's Cabaret, a collection of songs in the voices of Freud's early patients, featuring a number of guest vocalists including Euros Childs, Julie Murphy, Jon Langford, and Angharad van Rijswijk.

Writing
In 2007 her first novel, 'A Girl's Guide to Modern European Philosophy', was published in the UK by Serpent's Tail. It was also published in the US (Other Press), and in translation in Italy (Tropea), Sweden (Voltaire), and Turkey (Sel Yayincilik).

She has written two radio plays, 'The Confessions' (2009) and 'Against the Grain' (2010), both broadcast on BBC Radio 4. Her most recent play was a Radio 4 docu-drama to mark the fiftieth anniversary of the Profumo Scandal, entitled 'Well, He Would, Wouldn't He' (2013), and featuring Mandy Rice-Davies.

She has also written musical theatre pieces.  'I Sing of a Maiden', co-written with Rachel Trezise, was an exploration of folk song and young motherhood in the Welsh valleys (2008). The second, 'Dr Freud's Cabaret', with Anthony Reynolds, featured songs in the voices of Freud's early patients, including The Wolf Man, The Rat Man, Anna O, and Dora.

In 2013, her first crime novel, 'The House on the Cliff', under the name Charlotte Williams, was published by Macmillan. The second, Black Valley, was published in August 2014. These novels have been published in translation in the US (HarperCollins) Holland (Ambo Anthos) and Germany (Lyx Verlag).

Discography

Albums
 Night Visiting Songs (1998)
 Down in the Valley (2000)
 At Llangennith (2001)
 Winter Woods (2003)
 Quite Silent (2005)
 Dr Freud's Cabaret (2014)

Anthologies
 The Executioner's Last Songs (2003)
 A Woman's Voice (2004)
  Migrating Bird  (2007)
 John Barleycorn Reborn (2007)
 James Yorkston:When the Haar Rolls in Covers Disc (2008)
 Crow Club: Various Artists  (2009)
  Like the Sun Feeds From Flowers  (with Anthony Reynolds) (2010)

Bibliography

Fiction
 A Girl's Guide to Modern European Philosophy (2007)
 The House on the Cliff (2013)
 Black Valley (2014)

Non-fiction
 Will You Still Love Me Tomorrow (1989)
 Icons of Black Music (1999)

Plays
  I Sing of a Maiden (with Rachel Trezise) (2008)
  The Confessions  (2009)
  Against the Grain  (2010)
  Dr Freud's Cabaret  (with Anthony Reynolds) (2010)
  Well, He Would, Wouldn't He  (with Mandy Rice Davies) (2013)

References

External links
Official website

Psychedelic folk musicians
Alumni of the University of Sussex
British journalists
British women novelists
20th-century British novelists
21st-century British novelists
British women dramatists and playwrights
20th-century British women writers
21st-century British women writers
1954 births
2014 deaths
20th-century British dramatists and playwrights